Wild tansy is a common name for several plants. Wild tansy may refer to:

 Ambrosia artemisiifolia, native to the Americas
 Tanacetum vulgare, native to Europe and Asia